is a passenger railway station located in the town of Moroyama, Saitama, Japan, operated by the private railway operator Tōbu Railway.

Lines
During the daytime, the station is served by four trains per hour in each direction.

Station layout
The station consists of two side platforms serving two tracks forming a passing loop on the single-track line.

The station was rebuilt between 2012 and 2013 with a new station structure above the tracks, enabling station entrances to be built on both the north and south sides.

Platforms

Adjacent stations

History
The station opened on 16 December 1934.

Platform edge sensors and TV monitors were installed in 2008 ahead of the start of driver-only operation on the Ogose Line from June 2008.

From 17 March 2012, station numbering was introduced on the Tōbu Ogose Line, with Bushū-Nagase Station becoming "TJ-44".

A new overhead station building opened on 5 October 2013.

Passenger statistics
In fiscal 2019, the station was used by an average of 4,353 passengers daily.

Surrounding area
 Atarashiki-mura residential community

Bus services
Higashi-Moro Station is served by the "Moro Bus" community minibus (Yuzu Yellow Line) service.

See also
 List of railway stations in Japan

References

External links

  

Stations of Tobu Railway
Tobu Ogose Line
Railway stations in Saitama Prefecture
Railway stations in Japan opened in 1934
Moroyama, Saitama